LITNET is Lithuanian Research and Education Network in Lithuania. It was established in 1991 and had X.25 satellite connectivity to University of Oslo.

LITNET NOC is located in Kaunas University of Technology (KTU).

References

External links
 

Educational organizations based in Lithuania
Internet in Lithuania
National research and education networks